There are 20 stadiums in use by International League (IL) baseball teams. The oldest stadium is Sahlen Field, home of the Buffalo Bisons, which was built in 1988. The newest stadium is Polar Park, home of the Worcester Red Sox, which opened in 2021. Two stadiums were built in the 1980s, six in the 1990s, seven in the 2000s, four in the 2010s, and one in the 2020s. The highest seating capacity of all active stadiums is 16,600 at Buffalo's Sahlen Field. The stadium with the lowest capacity is CHS Field, the home of the St. Paul Saints, which seats 7,210. All stadiums use a grass surface.

Some 100 additional ballparks formerly hosted International League teams since the league's formation in 1884. These include stadiums from the Eastern League (1884), New York State League (1885), International Association (1888-1890), and Eastern Association (1891), each of which league officials consider part of its origins, and the Eastern League (1892–1911), which changed its name to the International League in 1912.

Active stadiums
{|class="wikitable sortable plainrowheaders"
!scope="col"|Name
!scope="col"|Team
!scope="col"|City
!scope="col"|State
!scope="col"|Opened
!scope="col"|Capacity
!scope="col" class="unsortable"|
|-
!scope="row"|121 Financial Ballpark
|Jacksonville Jumbo Shrimp
|Jacksonville
|Florida
|align="right"|2003
|align="right"|11,000
|align="center"|
|-
!scope="row"|AutoZone Park
|Memphis Redbirds
|Memphis
|Tennessee
|align="right"|2000
|align="right"|10,000
|align="center"|
|-
!scope="row"|CHS Field
|St. Paul Saints
|Saint Paul
|Minnesota
|align="right"|2015
|align="right"|7,210
|align="center"|
|-
!scope="row"|Coca-Cola Park
|Lehigh Valley IronPigs
|Allentown
|Pennsylvania
|align="right"|2008
|align="right"|10,100
|align="center"|
|-
!scope="row"|Coolray Field
|Gwinnett Stripers
|Lawrenceville
|Georgia
|align="right"|2009
|align="right"|10,427
|align="center"|
|-
!scope="row"|Durham Bulls Athletic Park
|Durham Bulls
|Durham
|North Carolina
|align="right"|1995
|align="right"|10,000
|align="center"|
|-
!scope="row"|Fifth Third Field
|Toledo Mud Hens
|Toledo
|Ohio
|align="right"|2002
|align="right"|10,300
|align="center"|
|-
!scope="row"|First Horizon Park
|Nashville Sounds
|Nashville
|Tennessee
|align="right"|2015
|align="right"|10,000
|align="center"|
|-
!scope="row"|Harbor Park
|Norfolk Tides
|Norfolk
|Virginia
|align="right"|1993
|align="right"|11,856
|align="center"|
|-
!scope="row"|Huntington Park
|Columbus Clippers
|Columbus
|Ohio
|align="right"|2009
|align="right"|10,100
|align="center"|
|-
!scope="row"|Innovative Field
|Rochester Red Wings
|Rochester
|New York
|align="right"|1997
|align="right"|10,840
|align="center"|
|-
!scope="row"|Louisville Slugger Field
|Louisville Bats
|Louisville
|Kentucky
|align="right"|2000
|align="right"|13,131
|align="center"|
|-
!scope="row"|NBT Bank Stadium
|Syracuse Mets
|Syracuse
|New York
|align="right"|1997
|align="right"|10,815
|align="center"|
|-
!scope="row"|PNC Field
|Scranton/Wilkes-Barre RailRiders
|Moosic
|Pennsylvania
|align="right"|1989
|align="right"|10,000
|align="center"|
|-
!scope="row"|Polar Park
|Worcester Red Sox
|Worcester
|Massachusetts
|align="right"|2021
|align="right"|9,508
|align="center"|
|-
!scope="row"|Principal Park
|Iowa Cubs
|Des Moines
|Iowa
|align="right"|1992
|align="right"|11,500
|align="center"|
|-
!scope="row"|Sahlen Field
|Buffalo Bisons
|Buffalo
|New York
|align="right"|1988
|align="right"|16,600
|align="center"|
|-
!scope="row"|Truist Field
|Charlotte Knights
|Charlotte
|North Carolina
|align="right"|2014
|align="right"|10,200
|align="center"| 
|-
!scope="row"|Victory Field
|Indianapolis Indians
|Indianapolis
|Indiana
|align="right"|1996
|align="right"|13,750
|align="center"|
|-
!scope="row"|Werner Park
|Omaha Storm Chasers
|Papillon
|Nebraska
|align="right"|2011
|align="right"|9,023
|align="center"|
|}

Map

Gallery

Former stadiums

Map

See also

List of Major League Baseball stadiums
List of American Association (1902–1997) stadiums
List of Pacific Coast League stadiums
List of Triple-A baseball stadiums

Notes

References

External links

Digitalballparks.com's photographic history of International League ballparks since 1901

International League
International League stadiums
 stadiums